San Rafael  is a neighbourhood (barrio) of Asunción, Paraguay.

References

Neighbourhoods of Asunción